Ockert Strydom (born 8 January 1985) is a South African professional golfer who plays on the European Tour and Sunshine Tour. He claimed his maiden European Tour win at the 2022 Alfred Dunhill Championship.

Professional career
Strydom won the 2019 Vodacom Origins of Golf at Sishen that was part of the 2019–20 Sunshine Tour.

In December 2022, Strydom won the Alfred Dunhill Championship, part of the 2023 European Tour and the 2022–23 Sunshine Tour, where he set a course record in the third round. Two months later, he won the Singapore Classic on the European Tour. He shot a final-round 63 to beat Sami Välimäki by one shot.

Professional wins (14)

European Tour wins (2)

1Co-sanctioned by the Sunshine Tour

Sunshine Tour wins (2)

1Co-sanctioned by the European Tour

Sunshine Tour playoff record (0–3)

IGT Pro Tour wins (11)

References

External links

South African male golfers
Sunshine Tour golfers
European Tour golfers
1985 births
Living people